Rodrigo Conde Romero (born 3 September 1997, in Moaña) is a Spanish rower. He won the silver medal in the double sculls at the 2022 European Rowing Championships.

References

External links

1997 births
Living people
Spanish male rowers
Sportspeople from Girona
World Rowing Championships medalists for Spain
21st-century Spanish people